Bolshoy Gorokh is a rural locality (a village) in Kalininskoye Rural Settlement, Totemsky District, Vologda Oblast, Russia. The population was 58 as of 2002.

Geography 
Bolshoy Gorokh is located 41 km southwest of Totma (the district's administrative centre) by road. Osovaya is the nearest rural locality.

References 

Rural localities in Tarnogsky District